Madelyn or Madalyn is a feminine first name. Notable people with these names include:

Madelyn 
 Madelyn Clare (1894–1975), American actress
 Madelyn Cline (born 1997), American actress
 Madelyn Dunham (1922–2008), maternal grandmother of Barack Obama
 Madelyn Pugh (1921–2011), American television writer who worked on the I Love Lucy television series
 Madelyn Renee (born 1955), American soprano formerly known as Madelyn Renée Monti
 Madelyn Vega, Puerto Rican journalist and attorney

Madalyn 

 Madalyn Aslan (born 1963), American-British writer, astrologer, and palmist
 Madalyn Godby (born 1992), American track cyclist
 Madalyn Murray O'Hair (1919–1995), American writer and activist
 Madalyn Schiffel (born 1994), American soccer goalkeeper

Fictional characters 
 Madelyn "Maddie" Hayes, in the television series Moonlighting
 Madelyn Stillwell, in the television series The Boys and The Boys Presents: Diabolical
 Madelyn Spaulding, a villain from Static Shock

English feminine given names
English-language feminine given names